Splicing factor 45 is a protein that in humans is encoded by the RBM17 gene.

References

Further reading